= Molten rock =

Molten rock may refer to:

- Lava, molten rock expelled by a volcano during an eruption
- Magma, a hot semifluid material found beneath the surface of Earth
